Gwynn's Falls is a neighborhood in the Southwestern District of Baltimore, located between Irvington (west) and Gwynns Falls Leakin Park (east). Frederick Avenue (Maryland Route 144) marks the neighborhood's boundary to the north; Wilkens Avenue (Maryland Route 372) draws its southern edge. Caton Avenue separates it from Irvington to the west.

Before 1977, the neighborhood was known as Carroll Station, for a station of the Pennsylvania Railroad formerly located here. Also known as the Frederick Road station, Carroll Station took its name from Charles Carroll of Carrollton, whose family previously owned the property now occupied by the Gwynn's Fall neighborhood.

Significant landmarks
Maryland Brush Company, located at 3221 Frederick Avenue in the Gwynn's Falls neighborhood, has been an employee-owned business since 1990. Founded in 1851, the company manufactures engineered and standard industrial brushes.

See also
 List of Baltimore neighborhoods

References

External links
 Southwest District Maps

Neighborhoods in Baltimore
Southwest Baltimore